The Zagłębie Steelers are an American football team in Będzin, Zagłębie Dąbrowskie, Poland. They play in the Polish American Football League.

History
The team was founded in September 2007. In 2008 PLFA season team joined to new created PLFA II. In the next season the Steelers won the league and was promoted to the top league, PLFA I.

Season-by-season records

Honours
 PLFA II Champion: 2009

See also
Zagłębie Dąbrowskie,

References

External links 
 Steelers at the Facebook

American football teams in Poland
Będzin
Sport in Silesian Voivodeship
American football teams established in 2007
2007 establishments in Poland